Consobrinomia is an extinct genus of sea sponges.

References

External links 

Sponge genera
Calcarea